Cacia intricata is a species of beetle in the family Cerambycidae. It was described by Francis Polkinghorne Pascoe in 1865. It is known from Papua New Guinea and Sulawesi.

References

Cacia (beetle)
Beetles described in 1865